Woodford is a village in the Blue Mountains in New South Wales, Australia, about 90 kilometres west of Sydney. It is situated on the Great Western Highway and has a railway station (opened in 1868 as Buss's Platform) on the Main Western railway line served by NSW TrainLink's Blue Mountains services.

History and description
The site was originally known as Twenty Mile Hollow. In the 1830s an inn called The Woodman was built there. Ten years later the inn became known as the King's Arms, later popularly known as Buss's Inn after 1855. Sydney businessman Alfred Fairfax converted the building into a private home some time later and renamed it Woodford House. The railway station adopted the name Woodford in 1871. Woodford House later became a private boys' school and is now a heritage-listed building.

A centenary time capsule was buried at Woodford railway station on 14 December 2002 by Chris Parr, Woodford's station master at the time. He collected items from the locals which went into the capsule to be opened in a hundred years.

Heritage listings 
Woodford has a number of heritage-listed sites, including:
 90-92 Great Western Highway: Woodford Academy
 Old Bathurst Road: Cox's Road and Early Deviations - Woodford, Old Bathurst Road Precinct
 The Appian Way (off): Cox's Road and Early Deviations - Woodford, Appian Way Precinct

Sports
Woodford is well known to mountain bike riders and walkers as the start point for the renowned Oaks and St Helena tracks. It is also the finish point for Andersons and Ingar fire trails, also popular with mountain bike riders and walkers. Each June or July, Careflight International raises money by conducting the Woodford to Glenbrook Classic, a cycling and running race from Woodford railway station to Euroka picnic area at Glenbrook in the Blue Mountains National Park. The Classic follows the Oaks and Bennetts Ridge fire trails, and is 25 km in length.

Tourism
The area also presents opportunities for bushwalking and photography in places like Murphys Glen and Wilson Glen (on the south side) and Mabel Falls Reserve (on the north side).

References

External links

  [CC-By-SA]

 
Towns in New South Wales